Rosa Carolina Castro Castro (born 3 February 2002) is a Mexican Paralympic athlete. She represented Mexico at the 2020 Summer Paralympics, where she won a bronze medal in the discus throw F38 event.

References

External links
 Profile  at Olympics.com

2002 births
Living people
Athletes (track and field) at the 2020 Summer Paralympics
Medalists at the 2020 Summer Paralympics
Mexican female discus throwers
Paralympic athletes of Mexico
Paralympic bronze medalists for Mexico
Paralympic medalists in athletics (track and field)
Sportspeople from Baja California Sur